The 2003 European Promotion Cup for Junior Men was the fourth edition of the basketball European Promotion Cup for U18 men's teams, today known as FIBA U18 European Championship Division C. It was played in Malta from 26 to 30 August 2003. Albania men's national under-18 basketball team won the tournament.

Participating teams

Final standings

Results

References

FIBA U18 European Championship Division C
2003–04 in European basketball
FIBA U18
International basketball competitions hosted by Malta
FIBA